PearPC is an architecture-independent PowerPC platform emulator capable of running many PowerPC operating systems, including pre-Intel versions of Mac OS X, Darwin and Linux. It is released under the terms of the GNU General Public License (GPL). It can be executed on Microsoft Windows, Linux, FreeBSD and other systems based on POSIX-X11. The first official release was made on May 10, 2004.

The emulator features a just-in-time (JIT) processor emulation core which dynamically translates PPC code into x86 code, caching the results. Despite running only on x86 host architectures, the JIT emulation core runs at least 10 times as fast as the architecture-independent generic processor emulation core.  However, according to the man pages supplied with Debian's packages of PearPC, even the JIT core runs around 40 times slower than the host machine would if executing native code.

Until December 2005 PearPC advanced quickly in speed, stability and features. After that time, however, there were no new releases until July 2011 (five and a half years later). Individuals have also been working on builds with more features such as native CD-ROM support and even progress in emulating sound had begun.  Builds including AltiVec emulation to run applications that require a PowerPC G4 processor were also produced, although there were numerous problems (mainly interface glitches) with running Mac OS X Tiger using such builds which were not resolved. Support for graphics acceleration was also worked on, which in theory should provide a major performance boost due to OS X's hardware-accelerated GUI known as Quartz Extreme which is currently not supported in PearPC.

Shortcomings 

The current official version of PearPC is 0.5.0 (released on July 12, 2015). While its PowerPC emulation handles most applications and the emulator already has an impressive feature set, the project still lacks features needed for a complete emulation of the PowerPC experience:
 Sound emulation (there are PearPC sound-test builds on the web, usually called ppc-snd)
 G5 (64-bit PowerPC) emulation
 Apple Disk Image (.dmg) support for use as an image (currently, to use a .dmg image the file must be converted into an ISO image (.iso)
 Mac OS X Leopard support (instead, try using OSx86)

On June 6, 2005, Apple's (then) CEO, Steve Jobs, announced that Apple would begin switching its computer's architecture from IBM's PowerPC to Intel's x86 platform. The transition was completed in August 2006. The news raised a lot of questions about the future of the PearPC project because although the project itself is a PowerPC emulator, it is used primarily to run Mac OS X on x86 machines. As Mac OS X can now be run natively on the x86 platform, including on non-Apple computers (albeit in contravention of the Mac OS X license agreement), interest in PearPC has waned since and attention now largely centers on running Mac OS X natively on x86 hardware or in virtualization software such as VMware Workstation.

Frontends 
PearPC currently lacks its own GUI—the 'Change CD' button found in early versions have been eliminated because it rarely functioned correctly. However, developers have made frontends for the program. Two of these are PearGUI, which looks like a Mac OS X application but is incompatible with current versions of PearPC, and PearPCCP (short for "PearPC Control Panel"), which is compatible with PearPC 0.3 and newer. PearGUI's incompleteness annoys many users and its 'Create Disk Image' feature is not yet complete (a severe shortcoming), but many users have praised its GUI. PearPCCP has a built-in configuration wizard in addition to other advanced features but is hindered by what many users believe to be an inferior interface and several bugs.  Some users also report that PearPCCP removes comments from configuration files, while PearGUI does not. The PearPC.net website also released its own Java-based PearPC-GUI, called APE, which is part of the PearPC.net Package. CherryOS is alleged to be simply a front-end for PearPC. Its website was shut down in May 2005.

CherryOS controversy 
Within five months of PearPC's release, another PowerPC emulator called CherryOS appeared, claiming to offer more features and greater speed. However, within hours of its announcement, questions were raised about the claims, with many experts and open-source advocates suggesting that CherryOS was nothing more than a repackaging of PearPC. The CherryOS Emulator was re-released in March 2005 as a commercial product. According to Cassondra Foesch, a principal author of PearPC, it still contained all or part of the code written for the PearPC Project. CherryOS also created questions regarding the legality of commercial software developed and marketed specifically to run Mac OS on the x86 architecture, since Apple's license agreement specifically states that the operating system may only be installed on Apple-labeled computers. Eventually, the distribution of CherryOS ceased due to the very high amount of criticism that had been directed at it.

In addition, although CherryOS supports native CD-ROM installation, the emulator itself runs a bit slower than PearPC does, even though it claims to run three times faster than PearPC.

Emulated hardware 
CPU: 
 PowerPC G3, or PowerPC G4
Ethernet:
 3Com 3C905C
 Realtek 8139

See also 

 Comparison of platform virtualization software

References and notes

External links
 
 PearPC.Net, a Community-run PearPC Site
 PearPC Web Forum
 PearPC Windows setup guide

Macintosh platform emulators
Free emulation software
PowerPC emulators
Virtualization software
Assembly language software